Susana Campos (August 31, 1934 – October 16, 2004) was an Argentine actress. She starred in the 1950 film Arroz con leche under director Carlos Schlieper.

Selected filmography
 The Beautiful Brummel (1951)
 Behind a Long Wall (1958)
 Police Calling 091 (1960)
 Como dos gotas de agua (1963)
 Romanza final (Gayarre) (1986)

References

External links
 
 

Argentine film actresses
1934 births
2004 deaths
20th-century Argentine actresses
Burials at La Chacarita Cemetery